Saphobiamorpha maoriana is a species of beetle endemic to New Zealand. It was first described by Albert E. Brookes in 1944. It has been collected in the Westland District.

References 

Scarabaeidae
Beetles described in 1944
Beetles of New Zealand
Endemic fauna of New Zealand
Taxa named by Albert E. Brookes
Endemic insects of New Zealand